4x4 Response is a UK based charity whose volunteers offer the use of their 4x4 vehicles to provide logistic support in adverse conditions, working with other Voluntary Organisations and the blue-light emergency services.
The Charity was set up to assist or facilitate 4x4 drivers that wanted to form a group in an area where there was no group currently in existence. The charity itself, while largely consisting of volunteers, in itself, is not a response group.

History
The emergency services have a history of calling on 4x4 owners in times of need, and volunteers with 4x4s have grouped together in the UK for a number of years.

In 1999 4x4 Response was established as a response group in Norfolk, and in 2005 national links were developed into a more formal association, resulting in the formation of the 4x4 Response Network in 2006.

In the Autumn of 2008, 4x4 Response became a registered charity (Charity number: 1126138), recognised by the Department for Communities and Local Government.

Operations
Although a national organisation, the charity operates through an affiliated network of thirty-two local groups. Each group has its own formalised Memoranda of Understanding with its user agencies, which include Category One and Category Two responders as defined by the Civil Contingencies Act 2004. These organisations include:

 Local Authority Emergency Planning Offices
 Police
 Ambulance Services
 St. John Ambulance
 Red Cross
 Doctors' Associations.

Most 4x4 Response groups are members of their Local Resilience Forum (LRF) and are an integral part of local resilience plans along with other voluntary organisations.

Groups are typically called out in response to instances of snow or flooding, or where access is required across rough terrain or where a conventional vehicle might otherwise be unsuitable, and typical tasks involve transporting personnel or equipment. Although they may work closely with emergency services, military and other Govt organisations, volunteers have no special status and no vehicular exemptions under the Road Traffic Act.

Local groups
As of December 2015 there are thirty-two local groups which cover almost the whole of Great Britain and the Isle of Man. Each group operates independently, but in the event of a major incident additional resources can be drawn from neighbouring groups. In most cases only one group serves a particular geographic area, although there are some exceptions, and to aid identification each group is allocated a two-letter code which forms the prefix for their volunteers' call-signs.

The services offered by each group varies according to local circumstances and geography; for example the Highlands of Scotland present different challenges to the fenland areas of Norfolk. 

As of July 2020. London is covered jointly by the four groups covering the neighbouring areas.

In some parts of the country, other organisations which are not part of the 4x4 Response network offer similar services.

Volunteers and vehicles
A wide range of vehicles are used by the volunteers, who own and maintain them at their own expense. Typical vehicles include various models of Land Rover, and four-wheel drive vehicles from many other manufacturers including Jeep,  Nissan, Toyota, Škoda, Suzuki and Ford. Although not necessary for the role, some are modified with additional equipment such as Winches or modifications for wading in deeper water, but many are of standard specification.

As volunteers are expected to take to the roads in potentially severe conditions they carry additional equipment in their vehicles to keep them and any passengers safe and warm. Many volunteers are also trained in first-aid, advanced driving or water rescue, and each group offers training in the risks most relevant to their operating areas.

Volunteers typically receive a contribution towards their fuel costs, but are otherwise unpaid. Volunteers are eligible for emergency services discounts through the Blue Light Card.

See also 
Civil defense
Civil Air Support
Lighthouse Authorities
Incident response team

References

External links 
 4x4 Response UK

Charities based in the United Kingdom
Fire and rescue in the United Kingdom
1999 establishments in England